Changera is a village in Dungalawda Panchayat, Neemuch district, Madhya Pradesh, India.

According to the 2011 Census of India, Changera had a population of 869.

References

Villages in Neemuch district